The Lac à la Catin is a fresh body of water in the watershed of the rivière à la Catin and the Saint-Jean River. This body of water is located in the municipality of L'Anse-Saint-Jean, in the Le Fjord-du-Saguenay Regional County Municipality, in the administrative region of Saguenay–Lac-Saint-Jean, in the province of Quebec, in Canada.

A few secondary forest roads including R0361 (south side of the lake) provide access to the Lac à la Catin watershed; these roads connect to route 381 (north-south direction) which runs along the Ha! Ha! River. These roads allow forestry and recreational tourism activities.

Forestry is the main economic activity in the sector; recreational tourism, second.

The surface of Lac à la Catin is usually frozen from the beginning of December to the end of March, however the safe circulation on the ice is generally done from mid-December to mid-March.

Geography 
The main watersheds neighboring Lac à la Catin are:
 north side: Rivière à la Catin, Bras à Pierre, Saint-Jean River, Éternité River, Saguenay River;
 east side: Lac de la Hauteur, Poulin Lake, Lac à Papa, Huard Lake, Bazile Lake (Mont-Élie);
 south side: Épinglette brook, Ouskyatou Lake, Scott Lake, Scott Creek, Malbaie River;
 west side: Épinglette brook, lac des Hauteurs, Cami River, Desprez Lake, Ha! Ha! River.

Its shape is broken by two peninsulas, one of which is attached to the north shore and the other is attached to the west shore (southern part of the lake). Its mouth is located to the northwest, at:
  west of a bay in Lac des Hauteurs;
  southwest of Lac Poulin;
  northwest of Lac Épinglette;
  north of the course of the Malbaie River;
  south-east of the confluence of Rivière à la Catin and Saint-Jean River;
  south-west of the confluence of the Saint-Jean River and the Saguenay River;
  south-east of downtown Saguenay (city).

From the confluence of Lac à la Catin, the current follows the course of:
 the rivière à la Catin on  towards the North;
 the Cami River on  towards the North;
 the Saint-Jean River on  generally towards the northeast;
 L'Anse-Saint-Jean on  towards the north;
 the Saguenay River on  eastward to Tadoussac where it merges with the Saint Lawrence estuary.

Toponymy 
The toponym "Lac à la Catin" was formalized on December 5, 1968, by the Commission de toponymie du Québec.

Notes and references

Appendices

Related articles 
 MRC
 L'Anse-Saint-Jean, a municipality
 Rivière à la Catin
 Cami River
 Saint-Jean River
 Saguenay River

Lakes of Saguenay–Lac-Saint-Jean
Le Fjord-du-Saguenay Regional County Municipality